Harold Korovin (born April 19, 1925) is an American former professional basketball player. He played for the Flint Dow A.C.'s in the National Basketball League for three games during the 1947–48 season and averaged 3.7 points per game. He also played in various other leagues for many different teams during the early era of professional basketball in the United States.

References

1925 births
Living people
American Basketball League (1925–1955) players
American men's basketball players
Basketball players from New York City
CCNY Beavers men's basketball players
Centers (basketball)
Flint Dow A.C.'s players
Paterson Crescents players
Sportspeople from Brooklyn